"Dear A&T" is the school song of North Carolina Agricultural and Technical State University. The words were written by Susan B. Dudley, wife of the second president, James Benson Dudley. Music for the poem was composed by Charles E. Stewart, director of instrumental and vocal music at the university from 1909 to 1917.

History
The words to the song were written by Susan B. Dudley, wife of A&T’s second president, James Benson Dudley. Music for the poem was composed by Charles E. Stewart the university's director of music.

"Dear A&T" acts as an official anthem of the university. The song traditionally concludes formal university events, including athletic contests such as football and basketball games attended by the North Carolina A&T State University Blue and Gold Marching Machine or the A&T Pep Band. It is more formal than the traditional fight songs such as "Old Aggie Spirit" and the "A&T Fight Song", and is typically played and sung in a more reverent fashion than other university songs.

Lyrics

The first verse of the song is the best known, and is usually the only verse of the song that is sung. The song, however, has three verses in addition to the refrain, however, in common practice, only the first verse and the refrain are sung.

The song's refrain “…from Dare to Cherokee” expresses Mrs. Dudley's true sentiments about the university and the students that attend. The objective was to draw students from as many counties as possible by setting a system of “state students”. This refrain became the watchword for recruitment, as out of all 100 counties that comprise the state of North Carolina; Dare County, which projects into the Atlantic Ocean and Cherokee, which rests in the Appalachian Mountains are the two furthermost counties in their respective ordinate directions.

External links
 "Dear A&T" Performed by The North Carolina A&T State University Blue and Gold Marching Machine

References

North Carolina A&T State University
American college songs
Alma mater songs